Count Akaki Tsereteli (1840–1915), often mononymously known as Akaki, was a prominent Georgian poet and national liberation movement figure.

Early life and education
Tsereteli was born in the village of Skhvitori, Imereti region of western Georgia on June 9, 1840, to a prominent Georgian aristocratic family. His father was Prince Rostom Tsereteli, his mother, Princess Ekaterine, a daughter of Ivane Abashidze and a great-granddaughter of King Solomon I of Imereti.

Following an old family tradition, Tsereteli spent his childhood years living with a peasant’s family in the village of Savane. He was brought up by peasant nannies, all of which made him feel empathy for the peasants’ life in Georgia. He graduated from the Kutaisi Classical Gymnasium in 1852 and the University of Saint Petersburg Faculty of Oriental Languages in 1863.

Career and legacy
Tsereteli was a close friend of Ilia Chavchavadze, a Georgian progressive intellectual youth leader. The young adult generation of Georgians during the 1860s, led by Chavchavdze and Tsereteli, protested against the Tsarist regime and campaigned for cultural revival and self-determination of the Georgians.

He is an author of hundreds of patriotic, historical, lyrical and satiric poems, also humoristic stories and autobiographic novel. Tsereteli was also active in educational, journalistic and theatrical activities.

The famous Georgian folk song Suliko is based on Tsereteli’s lyrics. He died on January 26, 1915, and was buried at the Mtatsminda Pantheon in Tbilisi. He had a son, Russian opera impresario Alexey Tsereteli. A major boulevard in the city of Tbilisi is named after him, as is one of Tbilisi's metro stations.

See also

Aneta Dadeshkeliani
Tsereteli
Tsereteli (Tbilisi Metro)

References

Bibliography
 Georgian Information Portal biography
 Donald Rayfield (2000), The Literature of Georgia: A History, pp. 159–168: "The luminaries: Ilia Chavchavadze & Akaki Tsereteli", .
 

1840 births
1915 deaths
Burials at Mtatsminda Pantheon
People from Imereti
Writers from Georgia (country)
19th-century poets from Georgia (country)
Nobility of Georgia (country)
Male poets from Georgia (country)
19th-century male writers